The London Hard Court Championships  and later known as the Bio-Strath London Hard Court Championships for sponsorship reasons was a clay court tennis event founded in 1919. It was held at the Hurlingham Club Ranelagh Gardens, Fulham, London, England through until 1971, when the it failed fined new sponsors for the following season, the tournament ended.

History
The London Hard Court Championships were first established in September 1919. The winner of first men's singles event was Romanian player Nicolae Mishu who defeated Australia's Stanley Doust. In the first women's singles event a decision was made to divide the title and prize between  Madeline Fisher O'Neill and Blanche Duddell Colston. In 1970 it was part of the Bio-Strath Circuit of tournaments as the third leg of the tour that year.

On 15 May 1971 after 52 years the final London Hard Court Championships was concluded. The final men's singles event was won by the Chilean player Jaime Fillol who defeated Britain's Gerald Battrick. The final women's singles title was won by Australian Margaret Smith Court who beat France's Francoise Durr.

References

Clay court tennis tournaments
Defunct tennis tournaments in the United Kingdom
Recurring sporting events established in 1919
1919 establishments in England
1971 disestablishments in England